The following is a bibliography of John D. Caputo's works. Caputo (born October 26, 1940) is an American philosopher closely associated with postmodern Christianity.

Books by Caputo
(1978) The Mystical Element in Heidegger's Thought (Ohio University Press)
(1982) Heidegger and Aquinas (Fordham University Press)
(1986) The Mystical Element in Heidegger's Thought (Fordham University Press paperback with a new "Introduction")
(1987) Radical Hermeneutics: Repetition, Deconstruction and the Hermeneutic Project (Indiana University Press)
(1993) Against Ethics - Contributions to a Poetics of Obligation with Constant Reference to Deconstruction (Indiana University Press)
(1993) Demythologizing Heidegger (Indiana University Press)
(1997) The Prayers and Tears of Jacques Derrida (Indiana University Press)
(1997) Deconstruction in a Nutshell: A Conversation with Jacques Derrida, ed./auth. (Fordham University Press)
(2000) More Radical Hermeneutics: On Not Knowing Who We Are (Indiana University Press)
(2001) On Religion (Routledge Press)
(2006) Philosophy and Theology (Abingdon Press)
(2006) The Weakness of God (Indiana University Press)
(2007) After the Death of God, with Gianni Vattimo (Columbia University Press)
(2007) How to Read Kierkegaard (Granta; Norton, 2008)
(2007) What Would Jesus Deconstruct?: The Good News of Postmodernism for the Church (Baker Academic)
(2013) The Insistence of God: A Theology of Perhaps (Indiana University Press)
(2014) Truth (Penguin)
(2015) Hoping Against Hope: Confessions of a Postmodern Pilgrim (Fortress Press)
(2015) The Folly of God: A Theology of the Unconditional (Polebridge Press)
(2017) Hoping Against Hope: Confessions of a Modern Pilgrim (Fortress Press)
(2018) Hermeneutics: Facts and Interpretation in the Age of Information (Pelican)
(2018) The Essential Caputo: Selected Writings, ed. Keith Putt (Indiana University Press)
(2019) On Religion 2nd Edition (Routledge)
(2019) Cross and Cosmos: A Theology of Difficult Glory (Indiana University Press)

Books edited by Caputo
(1992) Modernity and Its Discontents, ed. (Fordham University Press)
(1993) Foucault and the Critique of Institutions, ed. (Pennsylvania State University Press)
(1997) Deconstruction in a Nutshell: A Conversation with Jacques Derrida, ed./auth. (Fordham University Press)
(1999) God, the Gift and Postmodernism, ed. (with Michael Scanlon) (Indiana University Press)
(2001) The Religious, ed. (Blackwell)
(2001) Questioning God: Religion and Postmodernism II, ed. (with Michael Scanlon)  (Indiana University Press)
(2004) Augustine and Postmodernism, ed. (with Michael Scanlon) (Indiana University Press)
(2007) Transcendence and Beyond (with Michael Scanlon), ed. (Indiana University Press)
(2009) St. Paul among the Philosophers (with Linda Alcoff), ed. (Indiana University Press)
(2011) Feminism, Sexuality and Religion (with Linda Alcoff ), ed. (Indiana University Press)

Books about Caputo
(2021) Calvin D. Ullrich, Sovereignty and Event: The Political in John D. Caputo's Radical Theology (Tübingen, Mohr Siebeck)
(2020) Zohar Mihaely, Sacred Anarchy: John Caputo and the Challenge of Religions Today (Resling, Tel Aviv)
זהר מיכאלי, אנרכיה קדושה: ג'ון קאפוטו ואתגר הדתות כיום, תל אביב, רסלינג, 2020
(2018) Štefan Štofanik, The Adventure of Weak Theology: Reading the Work of John D. Caputo through Biographies and Events (SUNY Press)
(2015) Katharine Sarah Moody, Radical Theology and Emerging Christianity: Deconstruction, Materialism and Religious Practices (Ashgate)
(2015) Elian  Cuvillier, Ed., "John Caputo: Faiblesse de Dieu et déconstruction de la théologie," Special Issue of Études Théologiques et Religieuses, Volume 90 (No. 3): 2015.
(2012) Phil Snider, Preaching After God: Derrida, Caputo, and the Language of Postmodern Homiletics (Wipf and Stock Publishers)
(2010) Cross and Khora: Deconstruction and Christianity in the Work of John D. Caputo, eds. Neal Deroo and Marko Zlomsic (Wipf and Stock Press)
(2009) Christopher Ben Simpson, Religion, Metaphysics and the Postmodern: William Desmond and John D. Caputo, (Indiana University Press)
(2009) Ricardo Gil Soeiro, Grammatica da Esperança: Da Hermeneutica da Transcendencia à Hermeneutica Radical (Lisbon: Nova Vega)
(2002) A Passion for the Impossible: John D. Caputo in Focus, ed. Mark Dooley (SUNY Press)
(2002) Religion With/Out Religion: The Prayers and Tears of John D. Caputo, ed. James Olthuis (Routledge Press)
(1997) The Very Idea of Radical Hermeneutics, ed. Roy Martinez (Humanities Press)

Interviews
 (2010) "John Caputo – Postmodernism and Religion," with Luke Muehlhauser, Common Sense Atheism, September 15, 2010 (www.commonsenseatheism.com)
 (2010) "John D. Caputo Returns," Homebrewed Christianity 82, July 2010 	(www.homebrewedchristianity.com)
 (2009) "Good Soup and Other Gifts" in With Gifted Thinkers: Conversations With Caputo, Hart, Horner, Kearney, Keller, Rigby, Taylor, Wallace, Westphal (European University Studies: Series 23, Theology, Vol. 896), ed. Mark Manolopoulos (Bern, Berlin, Bruxelles, Frankfurt am Main, New York, Oxford, Vienna: Peter Lang Pub Inc., 2009), pp. 51–74.
 (2008) "A Theology of Our Desire: A Dialogue with John D. Caputo," Polygraph: An International Journal of Culture and Politics, 19/20 (2008): 159-175.
 (2008) "An Interview with John D. Caputo," Homebrewed Christianity (2008) on line at: http://trippfuller.com/?p=202
 (2007) "From Radical Hermeneutics to the Weakness of God: John D. Caputo in Dialogue with Mark Dooley," ed. Ian Leask, Philosophy Today, 51:2 (Summer, 2007): 216-26.  Reprinted in: Cross and Khora: Deconstruction and Christianity in the Work of John D. Caputo, Eds. Neal Deroo and Marko Zlomsic (Eugene, OR: Pickwick Publications, Wipf and Stock Publishers, 2010), pp. 327–48.
 (2007) "On the Power of the Powerless," in Gianni Vattimo and John D. Caputo, After the Death of God, ed. Jeffrey Robbins (New York: Columbia University Press, 2007), 114-60
 (2005) "Emmet Cole Interviews John D. Caputo," The Modern World (May 16, 2005 ) (https://web.archive.org/web/20130115014457/http://themodernword.com/features/interview_caputo.html)
 (2004) "In Praise of Devilish Hermeneutics," in Thinking Otherwise: Critics in Conversation, ed. Julian Humphreys (New York: Fordham University Press, 2004), pp. 119–23.	
 (2002) "Loosening Philosophy's Tongue: A Conversation with Jack Caputo," with Carl Raschke, Journal of Cultural and Religious Theory, Vol. 3, No. 2 (April, 2002).  An on line journal: www.jcrt.org.
 (2001) "What Do I Love When I Love My God?: An Interview with John D. Caputo," with Keith Putt, in Religion With/out Religion: The Prayers and Tears of John D. Caputo, ed. James H. Olthuis (London and New York: Routledge, 2001), pp. 150–179.

Journal articles & book chapters

2020
 "Gadamer and the Postmodern Mind," in The Gadamerian Mind, ed. Theodore George and Gert-Jan van der Heidne (a Routledge series Philosophical Minds).

2019
 "L'existance de Dieu: réconcilier le monde avec Dieu," trans. Pascale Renaud-Grosbras, Études Théologiques et Religieuses, Vol. 94, No. 1 (2019): 37-54. (Translation of Cross and Cosmos, pp. 127–39).
 "The Theopoetic Reduction: Suspending the Supernatural Signified," Literature and Theology, Ed. Heather Walton (Oxford: Oxford University Press, forthcoming 2019).
 "Tradition and Event: Radicalizing the Catholic Principle," in The Challenge of God: Continental Philosophy and the Catholic Intellectual Tradition, Eds. Colby Dickinson, Hugh Miller and Kathleen McNutt (London: Bloomsbury, 2019), 99-113. 
 "Continental Philosophy and American Catholics: Then, Now, and Tomorrow," in The Catholic Reception of Continental Philosophy in North America, eds. Gregory P. Floyd and Stephanie Rumpza (Toronto: University of Toronto Press, 2019), 90-113.
 "Ontological Difference," in 50 Concepts for a Critical Phenomenology, Eds. Gail Weiss, Gayle Salamon, Ann Murphy (Evanston: Northwestern University Press, 2019). 
 "A Response to Professor Risser," Duquesne Journal of Phenomenology.
 "Violence and the Unconditional: A Radical Theology of Culture," in Journal for Continental Philosophy of Religion, eds. Jason Wesley Alvis and Jeffrey Robbins, I (2019), 170-90.
 "The Subjunctive Power of God," Concilium, special issue "Politics, Theology and the Meaning of Power." ed. Joao Vila-Cha.

2018
 "Afterword: An Ear for My Voice," in Stefan Stofanik, The Adventures of Weak Theology (SUNY Press), eds. Joeri Schrijvers and Lieven Boeve.
 "Interpretation All the Way Down: Encountering the Unconditional," Legacy: The Magazine of The National Association for Interpretation, 29:5 (September–October, 2018): 21-3.
 "Theology in Trumptime: The Insistence of America" in Doing Theology in the Age of Trump: A Critical Report on Christian Nationalism, eds. Clayton Crockett and Jeffrey Robbins, Westar Seminar on God and the Human Future (Eugene, OR: Cascade Books, 2018), 77-81.
 "The Seminar on God and the Human Future: A Report on the 2018 Meeting," The Fourth R, Vol. 31, No. 4 (July–August 2018): 17-22.
 "Theology, Poetry and Theopoetics," in The Art of Anatheism, eds. Richard Kearney and Matthew Clemente (London & New York: Rowman Littlefield, 2018), 43-48.
 "From Sacred Anarchy to Political Theology: An Interview with John D. Caputo" (by Clayton Crockett) in The Essential Caputo, ed. B. Keith Putt (Bloomington: Indiana University Press, 2018), 18-43.
 "Radical Theologians, Knights of Faith, and the Future of the Philosophy of Religion," in Reconfigurations of the Philosophy of Religion, ed. Jim Kanaris (Albany: SUNY Press, 2018), 211-36.

2017
 "If There Is Such a Thing: Posse ipsum, the Impossible, and le peut-être même: Reading Catherine Keller's Cloud of the Impossible" Journal of Cultural and Religious Studies, 17:1 (December, 2017).  http://www.jcrt.org/archives/17.1/Caputo.pdf
 "John D. Caputo" (Interview by George Yancy in George Yancy, On Race: 34 Conversations in a Time of Crisis (Oxford: Oxford University Press, 2017), 73-80.
 "La Faiblesse de Dieu: Une Théologie radicale à partir de Paul," La Sagesse et la folie de Dieu: Lectures exégé tiques et théologiques de 1 Corinthiens 1-2, eds. Christopher Chalamet and Hans-Christophe Askani eds.(Geneva: Laboret Fides, 2017), 33-74; translation of "The Weakness of God: A Radical Theology of the Cross," in The Wisdom and Foolishness of God: First Corinthians 1-2 in Theological Exploration, Chalamet, Christophe and Askani, Hans-Christoph, eds. (Minneapolis: Fortress Press, 2015), 25-79.
 "Marcel and Derrida: Christian Existentialism and the Genesis of Deconstruction," in Living Existentialism: Essays in Honor of Thomas W. Busch, eds. Joseph C. Berendzen and Gregory Hoskins (Eugene, OR: Pickwick Publications, 2017), 3-23.

2016
 "The Rose is Without Why: The Later Heidegger," Philosophy Today, 15 (1971), 3-15. Chinese Trans. Wu sanxi in Journal for the Study of Christian Culture (June, 2016) (.）
 "Hoping Against Hope: The Possibility of the Impossible," Journal of Pastoral Theology, 26 (2016: No. 2): 91-101. Online at: http://www.tandfonline.com/doi/full/10.1080/10649867.2016.1244325
 "Devilish Hermeneutics, The Temptations of Jesus and Radical Theology," in Anfechtung: Versuch der Entmarginalisierung einers Klassikers, Eds. Pierre Bühler, Stefan Berg, Andreas Hunziger and Harmut von Sass, "Hermeneutische Untersuchungen zur Theologie," No. 71 (Tübingen: Mohr Siebeck: 2016), 191-208
 "'Let it Blaze, Let it Blaze:' Pyrotheology and the Theology of the Event," Modern Believing, 57:4 (2016): 335-48.
 "A Short Précis of The Weakness of God and The Insistence of God," Forum: Foundations and Facets, 5:2 (Fall, 2016): 107-18.
 "Religion and Deconstruction," in Talking God: Philosophers on Belief, ed. Gary Gutting (New York: W. W. Norton, 2016), 38-54.
 "Teaching the Event: Deconstruction, Hauntology, and the Scene of Pedagogy," in Eamonn Dunne and Aidan Seery (eds.), Pedagogics of Unlearning (Punctum Press), 109-28.
 "Anatheism and Radical Hermeneutics," in Reimagining the Sacred, eds. Richard Kearney and Jens Zimmerman (New York: Columbia University Press, 2016), 193-218.
 "The Insistence of Religion in Philosophy: An Interview by John Caruana and Mark Cauchi," in Symposium: Canadian Journal of Continental Philosophy, 20:1 (Spring, 2016): 11-32. Special topic: "Varieties of Continental Philosophy and Religion"

2015
 "Forget Rationality—Is There Religious Truth"? in Madness, Religion and the Limits of Reason, eds. Jonna Bornemark and Sven-Olov Wallenstein, Södertörn Philosophical Studies 16 (Stockholm, Sweden: Elendars, 2015), 23-40.
 "Theology, Poetry and Theopoetics," Foreword to Luis Cruz-Villalobos, Poesia, Teologia (Santiago de Chile: Hebel, Ediciones Colección Arte-Sana, 2015).
 "The Weakness of God: A Radical Theology of the Cross," in The Wisdom and Foolishness of God: First Corinthians 1-2 in Theological Exploration, Chalamet, Christophe and Askani, Hans-Christoph, eds. (Minneapolis: Fortress Press, 2015), 25-79.
 "Unprotected Religion: Radical Theology, Radical Atheism, and the Return of Anti- Religion," in The Trace of God: Derrida and Religion, (Eds.) Peter E. Gordon and Edward Baring (New York: Fordham University Press, 2015), 151-77.
 "Foreword" to Claudia Ruitenberg, Unlocking the World: Education in an Ethics of Hospitality (Bolder: Paradigm Publishers, 2015), vi xiii.
 "Proclaiming the Year of the Jubilee: Thoughts on a Spectral Life," in It Spooks: Living in Response to an Unheard Call, ed. Erin Schendzielos (Rapid City, S.D., Shelter50 Publishing Collective, 2015), pp. 10–47.

2014
 "Theopoetics as a Heretical Hegelianism," Cross Currents, 64: 4 (December,2014): 509-34.  
 "Derrida and the Trace of Religion," in A Companion to Derrida (Blackwell Companions to Philosophy) ed. Leonard Lawlor and Zeynep Direk (Wiley-Blackwell), 464-79.
 "Preface: The Audacity of God" to (Spanish translation of The Weakness of God).
 "Like a Devilish Knight of Faith," The Oxford Literary Review 36.2 (2014): 188–190.
 "The Wisdom of Hermeneutics," Foreword to Conducting Hermeneutic Research: From Philosophy to Practice (eds.) Moules, N.J., McCaffrey, G., et al. (Peter Lang, 2014)
 "Is Continental Philosophy of Religion Dead?," in The Future of Continental Philosophy of Religion, eds. Clayton Crockett, B. Keith Putt, and Jeffrey W. Robbins (Bloomington: Indiana University Press, 2014), 21-33.
 "The Invention of Revelation: A Hybrid Hegelian Approach with a Dash of Deconstruction," in Revelation: Claremont Studies in the Philosophy of Religion, Conference 2012, (eds.) I.U. Dalferth and M.Ch. Rodgers (Tübingen: Mohr Siebeck, 2014), 73-92.

2013
 "Review: Jean-Luc Marion, In the Self's Place: The Approach of St. Augustine, Jeffrey L. Kosky (tr.), Stanford University Press, 2012 in Notre Dame Philosophical Reviews (Jan 8, 2013). https://ndpr.nd.edu/news/in-the-self-s-place-the-approach-of-st-augustine/
 "Spectral Hermeneutics" (from After the Death of God), Polish translation, in Drzewo Poznania: Postsekularyzm w prezekfadach in komentarzach, eds. Piotr Bogaleckiego and Aliny Miyek-Dziemby (Katowicach: Uniwersytet Slaski w Katwowicach, 2012), 121-62.
 "Radical Theology as Theopoetics," in Theopoetic Folds: Philosophizing Multifariousness, eds. Roland Faber and Jeremy Fackenthal (New York: Fordham University Press, 2013), 125-41.
 "Outside the Box," Foreword to Peter Blum, For a Church to Come: Experiments in Postmodern Theory and Anabaptist Thought (Harrisonburg, VA: Herald Press, 2013), 9-14.

2012
 "Education as Event: A Conversation with John D. Caputo," with T. Wilson Dickinson, Journal of Culture and Religious Theory, 12:2 (Fall, 2012): 25-46. Special Issue: Pedagogical Theory and Special Practices. http://www.jcrt.org
 "The Weakness of the Flesh: Overcoming the Soft Gnosticism of Incarnational Christianity," in Intensities: Philosophy, Religion and the Affirmation of Life, eds. Steven Shakespeare and Katharine Sarah Moody (Surrey, England: Ashgate, 2012), 79-94.
 "Teaching the Event: Deconstruction, Hauntology and the Scene of Pedagogy," in Philosophy of Education, 2012: 23-34, ed. Claudia W. Ruitenberg (2012 Kneller Lecture, Pittsburgh, March 24, 2012)  http://ojs.ed.uiuc.edu/index.php/pes/article/view/3597
 "On Not Settling for an Abridged Edition of Postmodernism: Radical Hermeneutics as Radical Theology," in Reexamining Deconstruction and Determinate Religion: Toward a Religion with Religion), eds. J. Aaron Simmons and Stephen Minister (Pittsburgh: Duquesne University Press, 2012), 271-353.
 "Dieu, peut-être, Esquisse d'un Dieu à venir et d'une nouvelle espèce de théologiens," trans. Corine Laidet, in Les Temps Modernes, Nos. 669-70 (Juillet-Octobre, 2012): 274-88. ("Derrida, L'événement, Déconstruction," ed. Joseph Cohen).
 "Continental Philosophy of Religion: Then, Now, and Tomorrow," The Journal of Speculative Philosophy (Proceedings of the "Society for Phenomenology and Existential Philosophy," 50th Anniversary Sessions): 26: 2 (2012): 347-60. Extended version:  pp. e-1-e-24 | 10.1353/jsp.2012.0030
 "Ethics and Religion in Continental Philosophy," Journal of Speculative Philosophy 26 (2):e - 1 (2012). http://muse.jhu.edu/login?auth'0&type'summary&url'/journals/journal_of_speculative_philosophy/v026/26.2.caputo01.html.
 "Foreword," The William Desmond Reader, ed. Christopher Ben Simpson (Albany: SUNY Press, 2012), vii-x.
 Book Review: Christopher Watkin, Difficult Atheism: Post-Theological Thinking in Alain Badiou, Jean-Luc Nancy and Quentin Meillassoux in Notre Dame Philosophical Reviews, June 10, 2012. http://ndpr.nd.edu/news/31269-difficult-atheism-post-theological-thinking-in-alain-badiou-jean-luc-nancy-and-quentin-meillassoux/
 "Voir Venir: How Far Plasticity Can Be Stretched," in theory@buffalo, vol. 16 (2012), Special issue on "Plastique: The Dynamics of Catherine Malabou"): 107-123.
 "Augustine and Postmodernism," A Companion to Augustine, ed. Mark Vessey (Oxford: Wiley-Blackwell Publishing, 2012), 492-504.
 "Heidegger's Philosophy of Science," in Heidegger on Science, ed. Trish Glazebrook (Albany: SUNY Press, 2012), 261-80 [Reprinted from Rationality, Relativism and the Human Sciences, ed. Joseph Margolis (The Hague: Nijhoff, 1986), pp. 43–60].

2011
 "The Promise of the World," Transfiguration: Nordic Journal of Christianity and the Arts (Museum Tusclanum: University of Copenhagen), Vol. 10 (2010/11): 13-32.
 "God, Perhaps: The Dialectical Hermeneutics of God in the Work of Richard Kearney," Philosophy Today (Selected Studies in Phenomenology and Existential Philosophy, Vol 36) Vol 55 (SPEP Supplement, 2011):56-64.
 "Hospitality and the Trouble with God," in Phenomenologies of the Stranger: Between Hostility and Hospitality, eds. Richard Kearney and Kascha Semonovitch (New York: Fordham University Press, 2011), 83-97.
 "The Return of Anti-Religion: From Radical Atheism to Radical Theology," Journal of Cultural and Religious Theory, Vol. 11, no. 2 (Spring, 2011), 32-125. (http://www.jcrt.org/archives/11.2/caputo.pdf)
 "The Perversity of the Absolute, the Perverse Core of Hegel, and the Possibility of Radical Theology," in Hegel and the Infinite: Religion, Politics, and Dialectic, eds. Clayton Crockett, Creston Davis and Slavoj Zizek (New York: Columbia University Press, 2011), 47-66.

2010
 "Continental Philosophy of Religion," in A Companion to Philosophy of Religion, 2nd edition, eds. Paul Draper, Charles Taliaferro and Philip Quinn (Oxford: Wiley-Blackwell, 2010), pp. 667–73.
 "The Sense of God: A Theology of the Event with Special Reference to Christianity," in Between Philosophy and Theology: Contemporary Interpretations of Christianity, eds. Lieven Boeve and Christophe Brabrant (Surrey, Eng.: Ashgate, 2010), 27-42.
 "The Gap God Opens," Tikkun (Vol. 25, No. 2: March–April, 2010): 41
 "Praying for an Earthier Jesus: A Theology of Flesh," in I More Than Others: Responses to Evil and Suffering, ed. Eric R.  (Newcastle, UK: Cambridge Scholars Publishing, 2010), pp. 6–27.
 "Virtually Invisible: On Seeing in the Dark," in On Race and Racism in America: Confessions in Philosophy, ed. Roy Martinez (University Park: Pennsylvania State University Press, 2010), pp. 3–28.
 "The Weakness of God and the Iconic Logic of the Cross," in Cross and Chora: Deconstruction and Christianity in the Work of John D. Caputo, Eds. Neal Deroo and Marko Zlomsic (Eugene, OR: Pickwick Publications, Wipf and Stock Publishers, 2010), pp. 15–36.

2009
 "Good Soup and Other Gifts" [Interview] in With Gifted Thinkers: Conversations With Caputo, Hart, Horner, Kearney, Keller, Rigby, Taylor, Wallace, Westphal (European University Studies: Series 23, Theology, Vol. 896), ed. Mark Manolopoulos (Bern, Berlin, Bruxelles, Frankfurt am Main, New York, Oxford, Vienna: Peter Lang Pub Inc., 2009).
 "Bodies Still Unrisen, Events Still Unsaid: A Hermeneutic of Bodies without Flesh," Apophatic Bodies:Negative Theology, Incarnation, and Relationality, eds. Chris Boesel and Catherine Keller (Fordham University Press, 2009), 94-116; previously published in Angelaki: Journal of Theoretical Humanities, Vol. 12, No. 1 (April 2007): 73-86.
 Review:  Slavoj Zizek and John Milbank, The Monstrosity of Christ: Paradox or Dialectic?, Creston Davis (ed.), MIT Press, 2009.  Notre Dame Philosophical Review, 2009.09.33:http://ndpr.nd.edu/review.cfm?id=17605
 "What is Merold Westphal's Critique of Onto-theology Criticizing?" in Gazing through a Prism Darkly: Reflections on Merold Westphal's Hermeneutical Epistemology, ed. B. Keith Putt (New York: Fordham University Press, 2009), 100-15.
 Review: Mark Taylor, After God, in Journal of the American Academy of Religion, 77 (March, 2009): 162-65.

2008
 "Oltre la sovranità: molte nazioni, sotto un Dio debole," Iride: Filosofia e discussione pubblica (Società editrice il Mulino, Italy): Vol. 21, No. 54 (August, 2008): 323-336.  Italian translation of: "Beyond Sovereignty: Many Nations Under the Weakness of God," Soundings: An Interdisciplinary Journal, 89.1-2 (Spring-Summer, 2006): 21-35.
 "Listening to the Voices of the Dead: The Heterological Historian in Gill and Wyschogrod," in Saintly Influence: Texts for Edith Wyschogrod, ed. Eric Boynton and Martin Kravka (New York: Fordham University Press, 2008), 161-74.
 "On the Wings of Angels: Post-humanism and Info-technotheology," Proceedings of the Simon Silverman Symposium (Duquesne University, 2008)
 "Why the Church Deserves Deconstruction: A Preface to the Chinese Translation [of What Would Jesus Deconstruct?]  http://churchandpomo.typepad.com/conversation/2008/12/preface-to-the-chinese-edition-of-wwjd.html
 "In His Steps: A Postmodern Edition" Excerpt from Chapter 1 of What Would Jesus Deconstruct? in Global Spiral, Feb. 6, 2008, electronic journal published by the Metanexus Institute (www.metanexus.net )
 "Having Faith in Reason: A Response to Professor Wiebe," The Council of Societies for the Study of Religion Bulletin, Vol. 33, No. 2 (September, 2008): 85-86.
 "Open Theology Or What Comes After Secularism?" The Council of Societies for the Study of Religion Bulletin, Vol. 37, No. 2 (April, 2008): 45-49.

2007
 "Atheism, A/theology and the Postmodern Condition," in The Cambridge Companion to Atheism, ed. Michael Martin (Cambridge: Cambridge University Press, 2007), pp. 267–82.
 "Bodies Still Unrisen, Events Still Unsaid," Angelaki: Journal of Theoretical Humanities, 12:1 (April, 2007): 73-86.
 "The Hyperbolization of Phenomenology: Two Possibilities for Religion in Recent Continental Philosophy," Counter-Experiences: Reading Jean-Luc Marion, ed. Kevin Hart (Notre Dame: University of Notre Dame Press, 2007), pp. 66–93.
 "The Weakness of God: A Theology of the Event" in The Mourning After: Attending the Wake of Postmodernism, eds. Neil Brooks and Josh Toth, Postmodern Studies 40 (Amsterdam - New York: Rodopi, 2007), pp. 285–302.
 "Theopoetic/Theopolitic" (with Catherine Keller), Cross-Currents, 56:4 (Winter, 2006-7.
 "Avant la création: le souvenir de dieu de Derrida," trans. Patrick Dimascio, in Derrida pour les temps à venir, ed. René Major (Paris: Editions Stock, 2007), 140-58. [Translation of "Before Creation: Derrida's Memory of God," Mosaic: A Journal for the Interdisciplinary Study of Literature, 39:3 (September, 2006): 91-102.]
 "Die Tränen und Gebete einer diabolishen Hermeneutic: Derrida und Meister Eckhart," trans.Jochen Schmidt, in Dem Geheimnis auf der Spur, ed. Susanne Klinger und Jochen Schmidt (Leipzig: Evangelische Verlagsanstalt, 2007), 125-46.  Translation of ch. 10 of More Radical Hermeneutics.
 "Temporal Transcendence: The Very Idea of à venir in Derrida," in Transcendence and Beyond', eds. John D. Caputo and Michael Scanlon (Bloomington: Indiana University Press, 2007), 188-203.
 "From Radical Hermeneutics to the Weakness of God: John D. Caputo in Dialogue with Mark Dooley," ed. Ian Leask, Philosophy Today, 51:2 (Summer, 2007): 216-26.
 "Richard Rorty (1931-2007): In Memoriam," Cross Currents, 57, No. 3 (Fall, 2007): 434-38 and on-line at The Global Spiral (A Publication of the Metanexus Institute) 8:5 (August, 2007)available at http://www.metanexus.net/magazine/tabid/68/id/10108/Default.aspx
 Review: Jean-Luc Marion, The Erotic Phenomenon in: Ethics, vol. 118 (October, 2007).

2006
 "From Radical Hermeneuticss to the Weakness of God: An Interview with John D. Caputo, Conducted by Mark Dooley," Oregon Extension Journal (Ashland, OR), Vol. 8 (Fall, 2006): 5-10.
 "On Being Clear about Faith: A Response to Stephen Williams," Books and Culture: A Christian Review, Vol. 12, No. 6 (November/December, 2006): 40-42.
 "Without Sovereignty, Without Being: Unconditionally, the Coming God and Derrida's Democracy to Come," in Religion and Violence in a Secular World, ed. Clayton Crockett (Charlottesville: University of Virginia Press, 2006), pp. 137–56.
 "Beyond Sovereignty: Many Nations Under the Weakness of God," Soundings: An Interdisciplinary Journal, 89.1-2 (Spring-Summer, 2006): 21-35.
 "Before Creation: Derrida's Memory of God," Mosaic: A Journal for the Interdisciplinary Study of Literature, 39:3 (September, 2006): 91-102.
 Hauntological Hermeneutics and the Interpretation of Christian Faith: On Being Dead Equal Before God," Hermeneutics at the Crossroads, ed. Kevin Vanhoozer, James K. A. Smith and Bruce Ellis Benson (Bloomington: Indiana University Press, 2006), pp.95-111.
 "Looking the Impossible in the Eye: Kierkegaard, Derrida, and the Repetition of Religion," Chinese Translation by Wang Qi in World Philosophy, Vol. 21, No. 3 (2006): 4-21 [English original in Kierkegaard Studies Yearbook 2002, ed. Niels Cappelorn (Berlin: Walter de Gruyter, 2002), pp. 1–25.]
 "The Prayers and Tears of Jacques Derrida" and "Laughing, Praying, Weeping before God: A Response [to the papers of David Wood, Edith Wyschogrod and Francis Ambrosio]" in S. Clark Buckler and Matthew Statler, Styles of Piety: Practicing Philosophy after the Death of God (New York: Fordham University Press, 2006), pp. 193–204 and 253-69.
 "Richard Kearney's Enthusiasm," in After God: Richard Kearney and the Religious Turn in Continental Philosophy, ed. John Manoussakis (New York: Fordham University Press, 2006), pp. 309–19.
 "Jacques Derrida (1930-2004)," Cross Currents'', Vol. 55, No. 4 (Winter, 2006): 564-67.
 "Methodological Postmodernism: On Merold Westphal's "Overcoming Onto-Theology," Faith and Philosophy, 22, No. 3 (July, 2005): 284-96.

2005
 "Against Ethics," in The Sheed & Ward Anthology of Catholic Philosophy, eds. James C. Swindal and Harry J. Gentler, S.J. (Langham, MD: Rowman & Littlefield, A Sheed and Ward Book, 2005), pp. 510–22. Reprint, excerpted from "Reason, History and a Little Madness: Towards an Ethics of the Kingdom," in Questioning Ethics: Contemporary Debates in Philosophy, ed. Richard Kearney and Mark Dooley. New York: Routledge, 1999
 "Jacques Derrida and the Future of Religion" accompanied by a Portuguese translation: "Jacques Derrida e o Futuro da Religião," trans. Jaci Maraschino, Margens: Revista da Associação Brasileira de Estudos sobre Pós-modernidade, Vol. 1, No. 2 (2005) (www.margens.org.br.)
 "In Praise of Ambiguity," in Ambiguity in the Western Mind, eds. Craig J. N. De Paulo (New York: Lang Pub. Co., 2005), pp. 15–34.
 "Hyperbolic Justice: Deconstruction, Myth and Politics," in Emmanuel Levinas: Critical Assessments, ed. Claire Elise Katz with Lara Trout (New York and London: Routledge, 2005), vol. 4, pp. 67–84; reprinted from Research in Phenomenology 21 (1991): 3-20.
 "The Experience of God and the Axiology of the Impossible," in The Experience of God: A Postmodern Response, eds. Kevin Hart and Barbara E. Wall (New York: Fordham University Press, 2005), pp. 20–41.
 "Foreword: Of Hyper-Realty," in Ewan Ferne, Spiritual Shakespeares (New York and London: Routledge, 2005), pp. xiii-xv.
 "Emmet Cole Interviews John D. Caputo," The Modern World (May, 2005) (https://web.archive.org/web/20130115014457/http://themodernword.com/features/interview_caputo.html)
 "Hauntological Hermeneutics and the Interpretation of Christian Faith: On Being Dead Equal Before God," American Catholic Philosophical Quarterly, 79, 2 (2005): 291-311.
 "Filosofia e Posmodernismo Profetico," Revista Portuguesa de Filosofia, 60, No. 4 (2004): 827-43 [Portuguese translation of "Philosophy and Prophetic Postmodernism: Toward a Catholic Postmodernity," American Catholic Philosophical Quarterly, 74: 4 (Autumn, 2000): 549-568.
 "Jacques Derrida (1930-2004)," Journal of Cultural and Religious Studies, 6:1 (December, 2004) (http://www.jcrt.org/archives/06.1/index.html.)
 "Deconstruction," entry in Encyclopedia of Religion, Second Edition, 15 vols., ed. Lindsay Jones (New York: Thomson Gale, Macmillan Reference USA, 2005), pp. 2245–48.

2004
 "Jacques Derrida (1930-2004)," Journal of Cultural and Religious Studies, 6:1 (December, 2004) (http://www.jcrt.org/archives/06.1/index.html).
 "Death Sentence: The Promise of Death in Amos and Derrida," in Derrida and Theology: Other Testaments, ed. Yvonne Sherwood (London: Routledge, 2004), pp.
 "Jacques Derrida (1930-2004)," Third Way (London), December 24, 2004.
 "La Philosophie et le postmodernisme prophétique: Vers une post-modernité Catholique," trans. Jean Greisch, in Raison philosophique et Christianisme à l'aube du IIIe. Millénaire, eds. Philippe Capelle and Jean Greisch (Paris: Editions du Cerf, 2004), pp. 141–62; French trans. of "Philosophy and Prophetic Postmodernism: Toward a Catholic Postmodernity," American Catholic Philosophical Quarterly, 74: 4 (Autumn, 2000): 549-568.
 L'"idée même de l'à venir," La démocratie à venir: autour de Jacques Derrida, ed. Marie-Louise Mallet (Paris: Galilée, 2004), pp. 295–306.
 "Délier la langue," L'Herne: Derrida, eds. Marie-Louise Mallet and Ginette Michaud (Paris: Editions de l'Herne, 2004), pp. 66–70.
 "Foreword" to In Deference to the Other: Lonergan and Contemporary Continental Thought, eds. Mark Doorley and Jim Kanaris (Albany: SUNY Press, 2004), pp. vii-xiii.
 "No Tear Shall Be Lost: The History of Prayers and Tears," Ethics of History, eds. David Carr, Thomas Flynn and Rudolph Makkreel (Evanston, Ill: Northwestern University Press, 2004), pp. 91–117.
 "Olthuis's Risk: A Heretical Tribute," in The Hermeneutics of Charity: Interpretation, Selfhood and Postmodern Faith, eds. James K. A. Smith and Henry IsaacVenema (Grand Rapids: Baker/Brazos Press, 2004), pp. 41–51.
 "Good Will and the Hermeneutics of Friendship: Gadamer, Derrida and Madison,"Symposium: Canadian Journal of Continental Philosophy, 8, no. 2 (Summer, 2004): 213-25. (Special issue entitled "Working Through Postmodernity: Essays in Honor of Gary B. Madison," ed. Paul Fairfield).
 "Love Among the Deconstuctibles: A Response to Prof. Lambert," Journal of Cultural and Religious Theory, Vol 5.2 (June, 2004), www.jcrt.org
 "Either/Or, Undecidability, and Two Concepts of Irony: Kierkegaard and Derrida," in The New Kierkegaard, ed. Elsebet Jegstrup (Bloomington: Indiana University Press, 2004), pp. 14–41.
 "Apostles of the Impossible: God and the Gift in Derrida and Marion," Logos & Pneuma: Chinese Journal of Theology, No. 20 (Spring, 2004), pp. 51–88. [Chinese Translation of same in God, the Gift and Postmodernism, eds. John D. Caputo and Michael J. Scanlon (Bloomington: Indiana University Press, 1999), pp. 185–222.

2003
 "Apôtres de l'impossible: sur Dieu et le don chez Derrida et Marion," trans. Sophie-Jan Arrien, Philosophie, (Les Éditions de Minuit ) No. 78 (June, 2003): 33-51. [Translation of "Apostles of the Impossible: Derrida and Marion," in God, the Gift and Postmodernism, eds. John D. Caputo and Michael J. Scanlon (Bloomington: Indiana University Press, 1999), pp. 185–222.]
 "God and Anonymity: Prolegomena to an Ankhoral Religion," in A Passion for the Impossible: John D. Caputo in Focus, ed. Mark Dooley (Albany: SUNY Press, 2003), pp. 1–19.
 "The Experience of God and the Axiology of the Impossible," Religion after Metaphysics, ed. Bert Dreyfus and Mark Wrathall (London and New York: Cambridge University Press, 2003), pp. 123–45.
 "There Are No Truths, Only Texts," ARC: The Journal of the Faculty of Religious Studies, McGill University, 31 (2003): 13-22.
 "Jad oddzielic strone lew (niewlasciwa) od prawej (wlasciwej)," trans. Artur Przybystawki, Sztuka I Filozofia, 22-23 (2003): 14-21. Polish translation of "Telling Left from Right: Hermeneutics, Deconstruction, and the Work of Art," Journal of Philosophy, 83 (1986), 678-85.
 "Die diff é rance und die Sprache des Gebets," trans. Artur Boederl, in Die Sprachen der Religion, eds. Florain Uhl and Artur R. Boederl (Berlin: Parerga Verlag, 2003), pp. 293–316. Translation of "Tears Beyond Being," infra.
 "Derrida and Marion: Two Husserlian Revolutions," in Religious Experience and the End of Metaphysics, ed. Jeffrey Bloechl (Bloomington: Indiana University Press, 2003), pp. 119–34.
 "Without Sovereignty, Without Being: Unconditionality, the Coming God and Derrida's Democracy to Come," Journal of Cultural and Religious Theory, Vol 4, No. 3 (August, 2003). www.jcrt.org
 "More Rogues Than You Think: Derrida on the Cruel Logic of Sovereignty," France Today: The Journal of French Travel and Culture, Vol 18, no. 7 (September, 2003): 21-26.
 "Is There a Forbidden Knowledge," in Im Einsatz für Bildung und Erziehung: Festsschrift zum 70. Geburststag Prof. Dr. Joseph McCafferty, ed. Tadeusz Guz (Kisselegg: Fe-Medienverlag, 2003), pp. 51–70.
 "On Not Knowing Who We Are: Madness, Hermeneutics and the Night of Truth in Foucault," in Michel Foucault and Theology, eds. James Bernauer and Jeremy Carrette (Aldershot, UK: Ashgate Press, 2003), pp. 117–39. [Reprint of ch. 1 of More Radical Hermeneutics]
 "After Jacques Derrida Comes the Future," The Journal of Culture and Religious Theory, vol. 4, No. 2 (April, 2003). (An electronic journal: www.jcrt.org)
 "Confessions of a Postmodern Catholic: From St. Thomas to Derrida," eds. Curtiss Hancock and Robert Sweetman, in Faith and the Intellectual Life (Washington D.C.: The Catholic University of America Press, 2003), pp. 64–92.
 "Against Principles: A Sketch of an Ethics without Ethics," in The Ethical: Blackwell Readings in Continental Philosophy, ed. Edith Wyschogrod and Charles McKenny (Oxford: Blackwell, 2003), pp. 169–180.

2002
 "Tears Beyond Being: Derrida's Experience of Prayer," Théologie négative ed. Marco M. Olivetti (Padua: CEDAM, 2002), pp. 861–880.
 "For the Love of the Things Themselves: Derrida's Phenomenology of the Hyper-Real," Journal of Cultural and Religious Theory, 1.3 (July, 2000), www.jcrt.org. Reprinted in Fenomenologia Hoje II: Significado e Linguagem, Eds. Ricardo Timm de Souza and Nythamar Fernandes de Oliveria (Porto Alegre, Brazil: EDIPUCRS, 2002), pp. 37–60.
 "Good Will and the Hermeneutics of Friendship: Gadamer and Derrida ," Philosophy and Social Criticism, 28 (2002): 512-22.
 "Auto-deconstructing or Constructing a Bridge? A Reply to Thomas A. F. Kelly," American Catholic Philosophical Quarterly, 76 (2002): 341-44.
 "Looking the Impossible in the Eye: Kierkegaard, Derrida, and the Repetition of Religion," Kierkegaard Studies Yearbook 2002, ed. Niels Cappelorn (Berlin: Walter de Gruyter, 2002), pp. 1–25.
 "In Search of a Sacred Anarchy: An Experiment in Danish Deconstruction," in Calvin Schrag and the Task of Philosophy after Postmodernity, ed. William McBride and Martin Matuskik (Evanston: Northwestern University Press, 2002), pp. 226–250.
 "Por amor as coisas mesmas: o hiper-realismo de Derrida," trans. Paulo Cesar Duque-Estrada in As Margens: A proposito de Derrida, ed. Paulo Cesar Duque-Estrada (Rio de Janeiro: Editora PUC, 2002), pp. 29–48. [Portuguese translation of "For the Love of the Things Themselves")
 "We Are Not God: A Response to Stanley Fish, 'On Relativism'," The Responsive Community, 12 (Summer, 2002): 52-55.
 "Loosening Philosophy's Tongue: A Conversation with Jack Caputo," with Carl Raschke, Journal of Cultural and Religious Theory, Vol. 3, No. 2 (April, 2002). An on line journal: www.jcrt.org.
 "Richard Kearney's Enthusiasm: A Philosophical Exploration of The God Who May Be ," Modern Theology 18:1 (January, 2002): 87-94.
 "The Time of Giving, the Time of Forgiving," in The Enigma of Gift and Sacrifice eds. Edith Wyschogrod, Jean-Joseph Goux, and Eric Byonton (New York: Fordham University Press, 2002), pp. 117–47.

2001
 "Hoping in Hope, Hoping against Hope: A Response," in Religion With/out Religion: The Prayers and Tears of John D. Caputo, ed. James H. Olthuis (London and New York: Routledge, 2001), pp. 120–149.
 "What Do I Love When I Love My God?: An Interview with John D. Caputo," in Religion With/out Religion: The Prayers and Tears of John D. Caputo, ed. James H. Olthuis (London and New York: Routledge, 2001), pp. 150–179.
 "Messianic Postmodernism," Philosophy of Religion in the 21st Century, eds. D. Z. Phillips and Timothy Tessin (Hampshire, England: Macmillan/Palgrave, 2001), Claremont Studies in the Philosophy of Religion, pp. 153–66.
 "God is not diff é rance ," in Deconstruction: A Reader, ed. Martin McQuillan (New York: Routledge, 2001), pp. 458–63 (an excerpt from The Prayers and Tears of Jacques Derrida anthologized here).
 "The Poetics of the Impossible and the Kingdom of God," in The Blackwell Companion to Postmodern Theology, ed. Graham Ward (Oxford: Blackwell, 2001), pp. 469–481.
 "The Absence of Monica: Heidegger, Derrida, and Augustine's Confessions ," in Heidegger and Feminism, ed. Patricia Huntington and Nancy Holland (University Park: Pennsylvania State University Press, 2001), pp. 149–64.
 "Introduction: Who Comes After the God of Metaphysics?" in Blackwell Readings in Continental Philosophy: The Religious, editor John D. Caputo (Oxford: Blackwell, 2001)
 "What do I Love When I Love my God: Deconstruction and Radical Orthodoxy," in Questioning God, eds. John D. Caputo, Mark Dooley, Michael Scanlon (Bloomington: Indiana University Press, 2001), pp. 291–317.

2000
 " Philosophy and Prophetic Postmodernism: Toward a Catholic Postmodernity ,"American Catholic Philosophical Quarterly, 74: 4 (Autumn, 2000): 549-568. French Translation: " La Philosophie et le postmodernisme prophetique: Vers une post-modernit é Catholique, " trans. Philippe Capelle and Jean Greisch, UNESCO Proceedings.
 "People of God, People of Being: The Theological Presuppositions of Heidegger's Path of Thought," in Appropriating Heidegger, eds. James Faulkoner and Mark Wrathall (Cambridge: Cambridge University Press, 2000), pp. 85–100.
 "For Love of the Things Themselves: Derrida's Hyper-Realism," Journal for Cultural and Religious Theory, Vol. 1, No. 3 (August, 2000). Electronic journal (http://www.jcrt.org/current.html.)
 "Otherwise than Ethics, Or Why We Too are Sill Impious," in American Continental Philosophy: A Reader, eds. W. Brogan and J. Risser (Bloomington: Indiana University Press, 2000), pp. 261–293.
 "Adieu sans Dieu: Derrida and Levinas," in The Face of the Other and the Trace of God: Essays on the Thought of Emmanuel Levinas, ed. Jeff Bloechl. New York: Fordham University Press, 2000), pp. 276–311.
 "The End of Ethics," in Blackwell Studies in Ethics, ed. Hugh Follette (Oxford: Blackwell Publishers, 2000), pp. 111–128.

1999
 "Metanoetics: Elements of a Postmodern Christian Philosophy," Christian Philosophy Today (New York: Fordham University Press, 1999), pp. 189–223.
 "Postmodernism, Postsecularism, and the New World Disorder," in Europe after 1989: A Culture in Crisis? (Washington, D.C: Georgetown University Center for German and European Studies, 1999), pp. 25–41.
 "Who is Derrida's Zarathustra: Of Friendship, Fraternity and a Democracy to Come," Research in Phenomenology, 29 (1999): 184-198.
 "Toward a Postmodern Theology of the Cross: Heidegger, Augustine, Derrida," in Postmodern Philosophy and Christian Thought, ed. Merold Westphal. (Bloomington: Indiana University Press, 1999), pp. 202–225.
 "Apostles of the Impossible: Derrida and Marion," in God, the Gift and Postmodernism, eds. John D. Caputo and Michael J. Scanlon (Bloomington: Indiana University Press, 1999), pp. 185–222.
 "On Mystics, Magi, and Deconstructionists," in Portraits of American Continental Philosophers, ed. James Watson (Bloomington: Indiana University Press, 1999), pp. 24–33; German Trans. Neue Amerikanische Philosophinnen in Selbstdarstellungen, ed. James Watson (Frankfurt: Verlag Turia + Kant, 1998), pp. 60–72.
 "Heidegger," in Augustine through the Ages: An Encyclopedia, ed. Allan D. Fitzgerald, O.S.A. (Grand Rapids: Erdmanns, 1999), pp. 421–22.
 "Commentary on Ken Schmitz: "Postmodernism and the Catholic Tradition," American Catholic Philosophical Quarterly, 73:2 (Spring, 1999): 253-260.
 "Heidegger's Revolution: An Introduction to the Introduction to Metaphysics," in Heidegger toward the Turn: Essays on the Work of the 1930s, ed. James Risser (Albany: SUNY Press, 1999), pp. 53–74 [Reprint of ch. 3 of Demythologizing Heidegger]
 "Reason, History and a Little Madness: Towards an Ethics of the Kingdom," in Questioning Ethics: Contemporary Debates in Philosophy, ed. Richard Kearney and Mark Dooley. New York: Routledge, 1999. pp. 84–104.

1998
 "On Mystical and Other Phenomena," in Phenomenology in America, ed. Calvin Schrag (Dordrecht: Reidel Pub. Co. 1998) pp. 318–22.
 "Postmodernism and the Desire for God: An Email Conversation with Edith Wyschogrod, Cross-Currents, 48, No. 3 (Fall, 1998): 293-310.
 "An American and a Liberal: John D. Caputo's Response to Michael Zimmerman, Continental Philosophy Review, 31, 2 (1998): 215-220.
 "To the Point of a Possible Confusion: God and il y a," in Levinas: The Face of the Other. Pittsburgh: Simon Silverman Center, Duquesne University, 1998. pp. 1–36.
 "God is Wholly Other-Almost," in The Otherness of God, ed. Orrin F. Summerell (Charlottesville: University of Virginia Press, 1998), pp. 190–205.
 "Heidegger," in A Companion to Continental Philosophy, eds. Simon Critchley and William Schroeder (Oxford: Blackwell, 1998), pp. 223–233.

1997
 "Dasein," in Encyclopedia of Phenomenology (Dordrecht: Kluwer Academic Publishers, 1997), pp. 133–137
 "Dreaming of the Innumerable: Derrida, Drucilla Cornell, and the Dance of Gender," in Derrida and Feminism: Recasting the Question of Woman, eds. Ellen Feder, Mary C. Rawlinson, Emily Zakin (New York: Routledge, 1997), pp. 141–160.
 "A Philosophical Propaedeutic: The Very Idea of Radical Hermeneutics" (with Roy Martinez) in The Very Idea of Radical Hermeneutics, ed. Roy Martinez (Atlantic Highlands: Humanities Press, 1997), pp. 13–21.
 "Firing the Steel of Hermeneutics: Hegelianized Hermeneutics vs. Radical Hermeneutics," in Hegel, History, and Interpretation, ed. Shaun Gallagher (Albany: SUNY Press, 1997), pp. 59–70.

1996
 "A Community without Truth: Derrida and the Impossible Community," Research in Phenomenology, 26 (1996): 25-37.
 "Soll die Philosophie das letzte Wort haben? Levinas und der junge Heidegger über Philosophie und Glauben," in Festschrift for Hugo Ott, ed. Hermann Schäfer (Bonn: Haus der Geschichte. 1996.)
 "Instants, Secrets, Singularities: Dealing Death in Kierkegaard and Derrida," in Kierkegaard in Post/Modernity, eds. Martin Matustik and Merold Westphal (Blooomington: Indiana University Press, 1995), pp. 216–38.
 "Dark Hearts: Heidegger, Richardson, and Evil," in From Phenomenology to Thought, Errancy, and Desire, ed. Babette Babich (Dordrecht: Kluwer, 1996), pp. 267–75.

1995
 "Infestations: The Religion of the Death of God and Scott's Ascetic Ideal," Research in Phenomenology, 25 (1995): 261-68.
 "Bedevilling the Tradition: Deconstruction and Catholicism." In (Dis)continuity and (De)construction: Reflections on the Meaning of the Past in Crisis Situations. Ed. Josef Wissink. Kampen, The Netherlands: Pharos, 1995. pp. 12–35.

1994
 "Reason, History and a Little Madness: Towards a Hermeneutics of the Kingdom," Proceedings of the American Catholic Philosophical Association, 68 (1994): 27-44.
 "Sorge and kardia: The Hermeneutics of Factical Life and the Categories of the Heart," Reading Heidegger From the Start: Essays in His Earliest Thought, Eds. Theodore Kisiel and John van Buren (Albany: SUNY Press, 1994), pp. 327–343.
 "The Age of Repetition," Southern Journal of Philosophy, 32, Supplement (1994): 171-177.

1993
 "The Good News About Alterity: Derrida and Theology," Faith and Philosophy, 10 (1993): 453-470.
 "Heidegger, Kierkegaard and the Foundering of Metaphysics," International Kierkegaard Commentary, Vol. 6: "Fear and Trembling" and "Repetition", ed. Robert Perkins (Macon, GA: Mercer University Press, 1993), pp. 201–224.
 "In Search of the Quasi-Transcendental: The Case of Derrida and Rorty," Working Through Derrida, ed. Gary Madison (Evanston: Northwestern University Press, 1993), pp. 147–169.
 "On Not Knowing Who We Are: Foucault and the Night of Truth," in Foucault and the Critique of Institutions (above).
 "Heidegger and Theology," The Cambridge Companion to Heidegger, ed. Charles Guignon (Cambridge: Cambridge University Press, 1993), pp. 270–288.

1992
 "The Poetics of Suffering and the Deconstruction of Ethics," Joyful Wisdom: Sorrow and an Ethics of Joy, Studies in Postmodern Ethics, Vol. 2 (St. Catharine's, Ontario: Thought House Publishing Group, 1992), pp. 200–224.
 "How to Avoid Speaking of God: The Violence of Natural Theology," in The Prospects for Natural Theology, ed. Eugene Long (Catholic University of American Press, 1992), pp. 128–150.
 "Spirit and Danger," in Ethics and Danger, eds. Charles Scott and Arleen Dallery (Albany: SUNY Press, 1992), pp. 43–59.
 "The Difficulty of Life: A Response to Ronald McKinney," Journal of Value Inquiry, 26 (1992): 561-564.
 "Heidegger's Scandal: Thinking and the Essence of the Victim," in The Heidegger Case: On Philosophy and Politics, eds. Tom Rockmore and Joseph Margolis (Philadelphia: Temple University Press, 1992), pp. 265–281.

1991
 "Hyperbolic Justice: Deconstruction, Myth and Politics," Research in Phenomenology 21 (1991): 3-20.
 "Deconstructing Institutions: A Reply to Dauenhauer," Human Studies 14 (1991): 331-337.
 "Heidegger's Kampf: The Difficulty of Life," Graduate Faculty Philosophy Journal 14,2 - 15,1 (1991): 61-83.
 "Incarnation and Essentialism: A Reading of Heidegger," Philosophy Today 35 (1991): 32-42.
 "Deconstructing the Rahnerian Bridge: Heidegger and Aquinas," Philosophy and Theology (1991), Disk Supplement.

1990
 "Hermeneutics and Faith: A Reply to Prof. Olthuis," Christian Scholars Review 20 (December, 1990), 164-70.
 "Thinking, Poetry and Pain," The Southern Journal of Philosophy, 27 (Supplement) (1990), 155-82.
 "Radical Hermeneutics and Religious Truth: The Case of Sheehan and Schillebeeckx," in Phenomenology of the Truth Proper to religion, ed. Dan Guerriere (Albany: SUNY Press, 1990), pp. 146–172.
 "Derrida and the Study of Religion: (with Charles Winquist), Religious Studies Review, 16 (January, 1990), 19-25.

1989
 "Towards an American Pragrammatology: A Response to Prof. Sallis," Man and World, 22 (1989), 257-60.
 "Mysticism and Transgression: Derrida and Meister Eckhart," Continental Philosophy, II (1989), 24-39.
 "Gadamer's Closet Essentialism: A Derridean Critique," in Dialogue and Deconstruction: The Gadamer-Derrida Encounter, ed. Richard Palmer (Albany: SUNY Press, 1989), 258-64.
 "An Ethics of Dissemination," in The Ethics of the Other, ed. Charles Scott (Albany: SUNY Press, 1989), 55-62.

1988
 "Presidential Address: "Radical Hermeneutics and the Human Condition," Proceedings of the American Catholic Philosophical Association, 61 (1988), 2-15.
 "Demythologizing Heidegger: Aletheia and the History of Being," The Review of Metaphysics, 41 (March, 1988), 519-46. German translation: Heidegger Entmythologigisieren: Aletheia und die Seinsgeschichte, " trans. Michael Eldred, in Twisting Heidegger: Drehversuche paradistishchen Denkens, ed. Michael Eldred (Cuxhaven: Junghans-Verlag, 1993), pp. 66-91.
 "Beyond Aestheticism: Derrida's Responsible Anarchy," Research in Phenomenology, 18 (1988), 59-73.
 "From the Deconstruction of Hermeneutics to the Hermeneutics of Deconstruction," in The Horizons of Continental Philosophy: Essays on Husserl, Heidegger, and Merleau-Ponty, ed. Hugh Silverman (The Hague: Martinus Nijhoff, 1988), pp. 190–202.
 "Being and the Mystery of the Person," in The Universe as Journey: Conversations with Norris Clarke, ed. Gerald McCool (New York: Fordham University Press, 1988), pp. 93–113.
 "Modernity and the End of Philosophy in Being and Time," in Hermeneutic Phenomenology: Lectures and Essays, ed. Joseph Kockelmans (Washington: Center for Advanced Research in Phenomenology and Univ. Press of American, 1988), pp. 81–90.

1987
 "Derrida: A Kind of Philosopher, Research in Phenomenology, 17 (1987), 245-59.
 "The Economy of Signs in Husserl and Derrida: From Uselessness to Full Employment," in Deconstruction and Philosophy, ed. John Sallis (Chicago: Univ. of Chicago Press, 1987), pp. 99–113.

1986
 "Telling Left from Right: Hermeneutics, Deconstruction, and the Work of Art," Journal of Philosophy, 83 (1986), 678-85.
  "Radical Hermeneutics: Repetition, Deconstruction, and the Hermeneutic Project," Philosophy Today, 30 (1986), 271-77.
 "Cold Hermeneutics: Heidegger and Derrida," Journal of the British Society for Phenomenology, 17 (1986), 252-75.
 "Heidegger's Philosophy of Science," Rationality, Relativism and the Human Sciences, ed. J. Margolis (The Hague: Nijhoff, 1986), pp. 43–60.
 "A Phenomenology of Moral Sensibility," in Act and Agent, ed. G. McLean (Washington: Univ. Press of America, 1986), pp. 199–22.

1985
 "Three Transgressions: Nietzsche, Heidegger, Derrida," Research in Phenomenology, 15 (1985), 61-78.
 "From the Primordiality of Absence to the Absence of Primordiality," in Hermeneutics and Deconstruction, ed. Hugh J. Silverman (Albany: SUNY, 1985), pp. 191–200.

1980 to 1984
 "'Supposing Truth to be a Woman...': Heidegger, Nietzsche, Derrida," Tulane Studies in Philosophy, 32 (1984), 15-22.
 "Prudential Insight and Moral Reasoning," Proceedings of the American Catholic Philosophical Society 58 (1984), 50-55.
 "Husserl, Heidegger, and the Question of a Hermeneutic Phenomenology," Husserl Studies I (1984), 157-58. Reprinted in A Companion to Martin Heidegger's "Being and Time", Current Continental Research, No. 550, ed. Joseph Kockelmans (Washington: University Press of America, 1986), pp. 104–26.
 "Kant's Ethics in Phenomenological Perspective," in Kant and Phenomenology, ed. T. Seebohm (Washington: Univ. Press of America, 1984), pp. 129–46.
 "The Thought of Being and the Conversation of Mankind: The Case of Heidegger and Rorty," Review of Metaphysics, 36 (1983), 661-87; reprinted in Hermeneutics and Praxis, ed. Robert Hollinger (Notre Dame: University Press, 1985), pp. 248–71.
 "Heidegger's God and the Lord of History," The New Scholasticism 57 (1983), 439-64.
 "Hermeneutics As the Recovery of Man," Man and World 15 (1982), 343-67; Reprinted in Hermeneutics and Modern Philosophy, ed. Brice Wachterhauser (Albany: SUNY Press, 1986), 416-45.
 "Metaphysics, Finitude and Kant's Illusion of Practical Reason," Proceedings of the American Catholic Phil. Association 56 (1982), 87-94.
 "Heidegger and Aquinas," Philosophy Today, 26 (1982), 194-203.
 "Poverty of Thought: Heidegger and Eckhart," in Heidegger: The Man and the Thinker, ed. T. Sheehan (Chicago: Precedent Press, 1981), pp. 209–16.
 "Heidegger's Dif-ference and the ens / esse Distinction in Aquinas," International Philosophical Quarterly 20 (1980), 161-81.

1975 to 1979
 "The Presence of Others: A Phenomenology of the Person," Proceedings of American Catholic Philosophical Association 53 (1979): 45-58.
 "Transcendence and the Transcendental in Husserl's Phenomenology," Philosophy Today, 23 (1979): 205-16.
 "Fundamental Themes in Eckhart's Mysticism," The Thomist 42 (1978): 197-225.
 "The Question of Being and Transcendental Phenomenology: Husserl and Heidegger," Research in Phenomenology, 7 (1977), 84-105.
 "The Problem of Being in Heidegger and Aquinas," The Thomist 41 (1977), 62-91.
 "The Principle of Sufficient Reason: A Heideggerian Self-Criticism," Southern Journal of Philosophy 13 (1975), 419-26.
 "The Nothingness of the Intellect in Eckhart's Parisian Questions ," The Thomist 39 (1975), 85-115.

1970 to 1974
 "Meister Eckhart and the Later Heidegger, Part I," The Journal of the History of Philosophy, 12 (1974), 479-94;  Part II: 13 (1975), 61-80.
 "Kant's Refutation of the Ontological Argument," Journal of the American Academy of Religion, 42 (1974), 686-91.
 "Phenomenology, Mysticism and the Grammatica Speculativa ," Journal of the British Society for Phenomenology, 5 (1974), 101-17.
 "Time and Being in Heidegger," The Modern Schoolman, 50 (1973), 325-59.
 "The Rose in Without Why: The Later Heidegger," Philosophy Today, 15 (1971), 3-15.
 "Heidegger's Original Ethics," New Scholasticism, 45 (1971), 127-38.
 "Being, Ground and Play in Heidegger," Man and World, 3 (1970), 26-48.

References

Deconstruction
Bibliographies by writer
Bibliographies of American writers
Christian bibliographies
Philosophy bibliographies
Hauntology